Yungasocereus inquisivensis is a species of cactus native to Bolivia, the sole member of its genus, Yungasocereus.

It is a columnar cactus, appearing either as a tree or shrub, ranging up to 4–5 meters in height. The 6–7 cm diameter stems are dark green, with 6-10 ribs. The 1.5–3 cm spines are in groups of 4-12, with no differentiation into central and radial types, and range from a brownish to grayish color. The flowers are white, appearing in groups of 5-8 near the stem tips.

This cactus is known only from Yungas and Inquisivi provinces of La Paz Department, where it is found at elevations of around 2000m.

Cárdenas described the species in 1957 from Inquisivi, placing it in Samaipaticereus. Ritter later found the same species in Yungas, and in 1980 gave it its own genus Yungasocereus. After a period in Haageocereus, this was again separated into Yungasocereus.

References
 Edward F. Anderson, The Cactus Family (Timber Press, 2001), p. 681

External links
 
 

Cactoideae genera
Cacti of South America
Endemic flora of Bolivia
Trichocereeae
Monotypic Cactaceae genera